Henry Taylor (1872 or 1873–1957) was a unionist politician in Northern Ireland.

Taylor worked as a clothier and joined the Ulster Unionist Party.  Despite having no previous political experience, he was elected to the Senate of Northern Ireland in 1938, and served until his death in 1957.

References

1870s births
1957 deaths
Members of the Senate of Northern Ireland 1937–1941
Members of the Senate of Northern Ireland 1941–1945
Members of the Senate of Northern Ireland 1945–1949
Members of the Senate of Northern Ireland 1949–1953
Members of the Senate of Northern Ireland 1953–1957
Ulster Unionist Party members of the Senate of Northern Ireland